Wolffia columbiana, the Columbian watermeal, is a perennial aquatic plant in the subfamily Lemnoideae. This plant is distributed widely throughout North, Central, and South America, and also occurs in Curaçao.

References

Lemnoideae
Flora of Western Canada
Flora of Central America
Flora of South America
Flora of the Caribbean
Freshwater plants
Plants described in 1865
Flora of California
Flora of Oregon
Flora of the North-Central United States
Flora of Colorado
Flora of Texas
Flora of the Southeastern United States
Flora of the Northeastern United States
Flora of Montana
Flora of Ontario
Flora of Quebec
Flora without expected TNC conservation status